Alice, the main protagonist of Lewis Carroll's novels Alice's Adventures in Wonderland (1865) and Through the Looking-Glass (1871), has been adapted to several media.

Stage
The first professional stage adaptation of Alice's Adventures in Wonderland and Through the Looking Glass, the musical Alice in Wonderland, a Dream Play for Children, in two acts, debuted on 23 December 1886 at the Prince of Wales Theatre in London, England, and continued until 18 March 1887, to good reviews; it starred Phoebe Carlo as Alice. The musical was later revived and performed at the Globe Theatre from 26 December 1888 to 9 February 1889, with Carroll's friend, Isa Bowman, as Alice. The musical was frequently revived during the "Christmas season," being  produced eighteen times from 1898 to 1930. Alice's Adventures in Wonderland has since been adapted for various forms of the stage, including "ballets, operas, experimental theatre, Broadway musicals, puppet plays, mime acts, and rock musicals."

Film
Directed and produced by Cecil Hepworth, the first film adaptation of Alice's Adventures in Wonderland debuted in Great Britain in 1903 as a silent film and in January 1904 in the United States. Because of its nature as a silent film, "it circulated freely throughout Europe and America." It starred May Clark as Alice and Hepworth's wife as the Queen of Hearts. The British Film Institute has restored fourteen of the original sixteen scenes. Two more silent film adaptations of Alice's Adventures in Wonderland were produced: one in 1910 starring Gladys Hulette, and another in 1915 with Viola Savory as Alice. Ruth Gilbert starred as Alice in the first Alice film with sound (1931), followed by Charlotte Henry (1933), Carol Marsh (1948), Anne-Marie Malik (1966) and Fiona Fullerton (1972). Alice In Wonderland was also later Produced by Joe Roth who wanted to recreate a modern Alice In Wonderland. It was directed by Tim Burton. This version was based on Through the Looking Glass therefore Alice returning to Wonderland at the age of 19.

Disney

Animated film

Alice is the main character of Alice in Wonderland. Alice is portrayed as being very curious, often seen daydreaming and giving herself advice instead of listening to the advice of others. The closest thing Alice has to a friend is Dinah, her kitten, and not even she understands Alice's dreams of finding "a world of her own." Alice is well mannered, polite, courteous, mature and has an elegance and gentleness of a young woman, although once she falls into Wonderland she finds it harder and harder to maintain her composure. She is shown to be determined, but her determination is often overpowered by her temper, seeing as she does not give up on finding the White Rabbit until she gets frustrated, and is easily put off by rudeness. She wears a blue puffy short-sleeved knee-length wide-skirted dress, a white pinafore apron over-top and a black ribbon tied into a bow in her thick blonde shoulder-length hair on top of her head. Underneath her dress she wore frilly white ruffled knee-length bloomers over matching thigh-high stockings, a matching petticoat and black strapped Mary Jane shoes. She is voiced by Kathryn Beaumont, who later voice Wendy Darling in Peter Pan (1953).

Alice's Adventures in Wonderland had served as inspiration for Walt Disney's earlier Alice Comedies. By 1931, he had "storyboards and sketches" for a film adaptation of the children's novel; however, the release of another Alice film during the same year caused him to put the project on hold. With the conclusion of World War II, Disney considered the film again, planning it to be a combination of live-action and animation starring Ginger Rogers as Alice. In 1946, however, Disney decided to drop the live-action aspect of his Alice film and make it completely animated instead. For the voice of Alice, he wanted one "that would be English enough to satisfy British audiences and preserve the feeling of an English literary classic, but not so English that it would put off American audiences." He found that in young actress Kathryn Beaumont, when watching her in On an Island with You. Successfully auditioning for the role of Alice, Beaumont voiced the character and acted as reference material for the animators: her acting was recorded and used by them to animate the character. During the recording of her voice acting, Beaumont dressed as Alice to better aid her with "getting into character". Despite not being trained as a singer, she also provided Alice's singing voice, as Disney envisioned the songs as possessing a "childlike feel" to them. 
 
She also appears in many episodes of Disney's House of Mouse and in the direct-to-video releases Mickey's Magical Christmas: Snowed in at the House of Mouse and Mickey's House of Villains. She is now voiced by Hynden Walch. Alice can be seen as a meetable character in the Walt Disney Parks and Resorts. Alice can also be considered an unofficial Disney Princess, seeing as she appears in many instances of Disney Princess art, videos and other media (such as being a 'Princess of Heart' in Kingdom Hearts). In the film Who Framed Roger Rabbit, Alice is mentioned as "Allyson Wonderland" on some graffiti written on the bathroom wall in Toontown.

Disney Princess
Alice has appeared in official Disney Princess art, and is included in the Disney Princess music video "It's Not Just Make Believe" and "The Perfect Princess Tea" with the then eight official princesses, though she still remains excluded from the official lineup (see Disney Princess). It's also interesting to point out that despite not being recognized as an official Disney Princess, Alice was crowned Queen of the Looking-Glass Kingdom in Lewis Carroll's "Through the Looking-Glass, and What Alice Found There."

Kingdom Hearts series
Alice is featured as a character in the video game series Kingdom Hearts. She is the second Princess of Heart encountered in the game and her world, Wonderland, is also the second Disney-based world visited. Alice also appears in the sequel, Kingdom Hearts: Chain of Memories, as a figment of the memories of Sora, the game's protagonist. She is also present in Kingdom Hearts coded, as a data-based version from Jiminy's Journal. Though she does not make an appearance in Kingdom Hearts II, she, along with all of the other Princesses of Heart, was referenced. In the Japanese version she was voiced by Mika Doi, and in the English version Alice was originally voiced by her original voice actress Kathryn Beaumont for Kingdom Hearts, but following her retirement from the role, Alice was voiced by Beaumont's replacement Hynden Walch for the HD Cinematics of Re:Coded in Kingdom Hearts HD 2.5 Remix.

Disney Magical World
Wonderland is one of the four Disney movie-themed worlds accessible in the Nintendo 3DS game "Disney Magical World," and several characters from the film appear in the game, including Alice herself. The player may also collect items and clothing pieces inspired by the Disney movie.

Tim Burton films

Alice Mollinia Kingsleigh (Mia Wasikowska) is a 19-year-old girl "who doesn't quite fit into Victorian society and structure." Her return to Wonderland – having previously visited it as a child, although she has since forgotten it as anything other than a dream, and now required to return to defeat the Jabberwocky – "becomes a rite of passage as she discovers her voice and herself." Screenwriter Linda Woolverton researched how young women were expected to behave in the Victorian era and then made Alice the opposite. Independent columnist Liz Hoggard praised Alice as a role model for girls, describing the character as "stubborn, brave, [and] non-girlie." Alice is portrayed in the movie as a pretty young girl with a calm, serene disposition and a soothing voice tone. Mairi Ella Challen portrays Alice as a six-year-old.

Mia Wasikowska reprised her role as Alice Kingsleigh in the 2016 sequel Alice Through the Looking Glass.

Once Upon a Time in Wonderland
Alice is the central character in the 2013 fantasy series Once Upon a Time in Wonderland (a spin-off to Once Upon a Time) portrayed by Sophie Lowe. The story is set in a fictional Victorian England-theme world and takes place after Alice has returned from Wonderland. Due to the stories she tells about the hookah-smoking caterpillar and Cyrus, played by Peter Gadiot, the genie she fell in love with and believed to be dead, she is declared insane and placed in London’s Bethlem Asylum.  The doctors decide that the best treatment for Alice is a procedure that will make her forget Wonderland and all of the events that happened there. Alice, wanting to forget her painful past, agrees to the procedure. The night before the procedure, the White Rabbit, voiced by John Lithgow, and the Knave of Hearts, played by Michael Socha arrive in the asylum and tell Alice that Cyrus is not dead but may be in danger. Hearing this, Alice agrees to go back to Wonderland and help find her true love. It is later revealed that Cyrus is being held prisoner by Jafar (played by Naveen Andrews) who wants to use Cyrus’ magic to take over Wonderland and who is also working with the evil Red Queen (played by Emma Rigby). 
Throughout the series, Alice and the Knave of Hearts work together to try and rescue Cyrus and stop the Red Queen and Jafar from wrecking more havoc in Wonderland.

Once Upon a Time
Alice is a recurring character in the seventh season of the fantasy series Once Upon a Time, portrayed by Rose Reynolds. She is the daughter of the Wish Realm version of Killian Jones (played by Colin O'Donoghue) and Mother Gothel (played by Emma Booth). Alice is the lover of Robin, played by Tiera Skovbye, who is the daughter of Robin Hood (Sean Maguire) and Zelena (Rebecca Mader). Her cursed identity in Hyperion Heights was "Tilly".

Appearances in other media
Besides the books and the Disney film, Alice has appeared in many other works:

Television
A 1966 Hanna-Barbera animated special, Alice in Wonderland or What's a Nice Kid Like You Doing in a Place Like This?, is a modernized take on the book, with Janet Waldo as Alice.

Warehouse 13, a Syfy channel TV series, featured an evil version of Alice during the second half of season 1. In the show, Lewis Carroll's books weren't fake, but chronicles based on Alice's adventures in Wonderland masquerading as fiction. The mirror she passed through, after enough uses, made Alice go "Mad as a Hatter", turning her into a sociopathic killer.

A 1973 Star Trek: The Animated Series, Once Upon a Planet, Alice appears ask Lieutenant Uhura where the White Rabbit is.

Full House (season 6) in The House meet the mouse part 2 aired on May 18, 1993 in Tea Party Mary Kate Olsen as Michelle Tanner is having a tea party with Snow White and all her other favorite Disney characters (her second wish), she still wishes she had not wandered off, because now she misses her family.  In Seating Arrangement (Center) Mickey Mouse. (Right Seating Arrangement) Gail Edwards as Vicky Larson, The Late Bob Saget (1952 -2022) of America's Funniest Video as Danny Tanner,   Donald Duck, Minnie Mouse, White Rabbit and Snow White. (Left Seating Arrangement)  Dopey, Pinocchio beside Jodie Sweeten as Stephanie Tanner, Candace Cameron Bure as D.J. Tanner and Andrea Barber as Kimmy Gibbler beside Alice Pleasance Liddell.

In the 2009 miniseries Alice, Alice (Caterina Scorsone) is a 20-year-old judo instructor. A man named Jack Chase gives her the Stone of Wonderland before being kidnapped by the White Rabbit. Alice follows Jack to Wonderland, set 150 years after the original adventure, where the Red Queen rules the land.

Films
In 1987 film The Care Bears Adventure in Wonderland, Alice (voiced by Tracey Moore) is a young and shy blonde girl with an apparent self-esteem problem, as she thinks that she is not "special," until the Care Bears decide she is the girl who more closely resembles the missing Princess of Wonderland, so Alice takes the place of the Princess and ultimately learns to believe in herself. In this film, Alice is shown wearing casual clothing (a white shirt with a pink stripe, purple pants, blue jacket and pink shoes) and having a ponytail in her hair.

The Czech surrealist Jan Švankmajer retold the story in a very dark 1988 film titled simply Alice. Kristýna Kohoutová portrayed her and her English dub was done by Camilla Power. Woody Allen's film Alice, while not a direct adaptation, did follow a woman who has a series of surreal adventures.

Comics
Alice Fairchild appears as an aging woman and a 14-year-old girl in Alan Moore and Melinda Gebbie's 1991 explicit graphic novel Lost Girls.

In Alan Moore and Kevin O'Neill's League Of Extraordinary Gentlemen, Alice is referred to as Miss A. L.

Alice Liddell is one of the main characters in Andy Weir and Sarah Andersen's webcomic Cheshire Crossing.

Alice appears as a college-attending teenager alongside Wendy Darling, Dorothy Gale, and Susan Pevensie in Chicago of 2005 and 2006, in the comic book series The Oz/Wonderland Chronicles.

Alice Liddle is the main character of Zenescope Entertainment's Grimm Fairy Tales: Return to Wonderland (2007-08), Alice In Wonderland (2012), Wonderland (2012-16), and Wonderland: Down the Rabbit Hole (2013).

Manga and anime
Alice has appeared in two manga  by CLAMP: Miyuki-chan in Wonderland (1993)  and Key Princess Story: Eternal Alice Rondo

In the manga Pandora Hearts had Alice as the heroine but has a twin sister the white hair Alice The Intention of Abyss who are also based on the Red Queen and White Queen as well as Alice and her sister. They had Oz the B-Rabbit and Cheshire Cat as companions were originally a stuff rabbit and a cat, but later become chains with human bodies. Their Mother of Lacie which is an anagram of Alice.

In shoujo manga, Alice in Murderland, the main protagonists dresses up as titler character.

In the 2011 anime Black Butler season 2, the main character is read Alice in Wonderland by his butler while in a coma. As a result, Ciel dreamt that he was Alice.

In the Ouran High School Host Club episode "Haruhi in Wonderland", protagonist Haruhi Fujioka falls asleep and finds herself in an adapted version of Wonderland.

In the  Cardcaptor Sakura, episode Sakura and Sakura from Wonderland, the majority of the episode pays homage to the story, with Sakura Kinomoto playing Alice. 

In the sequel series Cardcaptor Sakura Clear Card, Akiho Shinomoto invites Sakura Kinomoto and Tomoyo Daidouji to her home to visit her library, where Akiho picks up a book titled Alice in Clockland.

In July 30, 2011 Alice in the Country of Hearts under by: Asahi Production Produce by & Yutaka Ōhashi and Directed by Hideaki Ōba.

Voice of Alice Liddell by: Rie Kugimiya.

Video games
She appears in Atlus' 1992 video game Shin Megami Tensei as a mini-boss, and has since become a staple demon in the Megami Tensei series. Her appearance and abilities are based on Carrol's character and popular media depictions, while her violent behavior and demeanor are said to be based on a European legend used to scare unruly children into behaving. The myth describes a deceased girl's spirit, who kills misbehaving children so that they can be friends in death. 

In the 2000 PC game American McGee's Alice, Alice is portrayed as an older, dark-brown haired girl with emerald green eyes. In the game, Alice is a tortured young woman, who at a young age was orphaned when her parents and her sister were burned alive in an accidental fire caused by her cat Dinah. Afterward, she falls into a catatonic state, and is condemned to Rutledge's Asylum for treatment. There she remains for many years, faced with her own survivor's guilt and the mistreatment of patients in the mental hospitals of the time. Then, the White Rabbit arrives in her cell and tells her she must return to Wonderland and save the creatures there from the tyrannical Queen of Hearts. By doing so, she not only saves Wonderland, but her own sanity.

In the 2011 sequel, Alice: Madness Returns, Alice is again tormented by hallucinations of a corrupted Wonderland, being destroyed by the mysterious Infernal Train and increasingly blending with reality. Throughout the game, she battles the mysterious Ruin, a mark of the Train's influence on Alice's mind, while struggling to piece together her repressed memories of the fire that killed her parents and sister. The second game gives her last name as "Liddell," which is the last name of the little girl rumored to have inspired Alice. American McGee's Alice has Susie Brann voicing the titular character.

In the 2003 video game Alice in the Country of Hearts. which got a manga adaptation.

In Sunsoft's 2006 mobile game , Alice is re-imagined as a sixteen-year-old Japanese girl named Ariko Katsuragi, also called "Alice" by the Wonderland denizens (as "Alice" sounds similar to "Ariko" in Japanese) and to her younger self in the real world as well. In this game, Ariko is a quiet, normal girl that is constantly bewildered by the bizarreness of Wonderland. Ariko suffers from suicidal depression after losing her father in a fire at age four, enduring years of abuse from her mentally and emotionally unstable mother, and nearly killing herself after witnessing her mother almost murdering her fiancé during one of her psychotic episodes. Throughout the game, Ariko and the Cheshire Cat chases after the White Rabbit, unlocking the tragic memories she suppressed in her mind and regaining her will to live on the way. In this iteration, Ariko is stated to be Wonderland's creator (but not the ruler) and is beloved by all the residents (though her depression greatly warped many characters' love for her), as Wonderland is her coping mechanism to deal with her traumatic childhood. In the bad endings of the game, Ariko can die by the hands of the other characters, have a complete mental breakdown, or kills herself since she is unable overcome her trauma.

Novels
In Frank Beddor's 2004 novel, The Looking Glass Wars, an adaptation of the Alice books, Alice is re-imagined as Alyss Heart, the rightful heir to the throne of Wonderland and a warrior princess with magical powers of her own. The preface of the story is that Alyss fled to Earth where she met Lewis Carroll and told him her story. He turned it into a nonsensical fairytale in which he even misspelled her name.

Alice is a rebellious teenager in Raul Alberto Contreras dark-humored novel Alice's Bloody Adventures in Wonderland.

Other
In the Tokyo Disneyland DreamLights version of the Main Street Electrical Parade, Alice is voiced by Kat Cressida.

Alice appears in the Mad T Party at Disney's California Adventure park. She is portrayed after Tim Burton's version of Alice. She is often found onstage doing vocals in the Mad T Party band alongside the Mad Hatter.

In Mattel's Doll franchise Ever After High, Alice has a child named Alistair Wonderland.

See also 

 Alice (Alice's Adventures in Wonderland)
 Films and television programmes based on Alice in Wonderland
 List of minor characters in the Alice series

References 

Lewis Carroll characters
Literary characters introduced in 1865
Fictional English people
Fictional queens
Child characters in anime and manga
Child characters in comics
Child characters in film
Child characters in animated films
Child characters in literature
Child characters in television
Child characters in video games